Cayman Athletic SC is a Cayman Islander football club based in George Town, which currently plays in Cayman Islands' Premier League, having been promoted from the first division in 2011 as champions.

Current roster
The team's roster contains the following full internationals.

See also
 caymanactive.com
 caribbeanfootballdatabase.com

References

Football clubs in the Cayman Islands